Elizabeth Juliene Mikel (née Lacy; born November 7, 1963) is an American actress and jazz vocalist from Dallas, Texas.  She is best known for her role as Corrina "Mama" Williams, mother of star running back Brian "Smash" Williams, on the NBC television series Friday Night Lights.

Career
Liz Mikel has been performing on stage for more than twenty years, including extended runs with the Dallas Theater Center and Theater Three. In 2007, the Dallas Morning News described Mikel as "a fixture on the Dallas theater scene". She stepped in for Oprah Winfrey in a special 2008 performance of The Vagina Monologues.

Her film credits include roles in The Quest for Freedom, It's in the Water, Detention (aka Learning Curve), Seventy-8, Carried Away, and as Ruthie Jenkins in Welcome Home, Roscoe Jenkins. Besides Friday Night Lights, television roles have included guest appearances on LAX, Prison Break, and Past Life plus a recurring role as Maggie on Sordid Lives: The Series.

Dallas Morning News theater critic Jerome Weeks once described Mikel's voice as "an immense, joyful force" and stated, "If a mountain range could belt a bawdy song, it would sound like Mikel."

Liz starred on Broadway in Lysistrata Jones, for which the New York Times praised her performance as "commanding."

Awards and honors
In 1998, Mikel received the Leon Rabin Award for "Outstanding Performance by an Actress in a Musical" from the Dallas Theatre League. She has also been the recipient of the Sankofa Award for her "dedication to the Arts in the Community" and the Dallas Theater Critics Forum Award 2004 for her role in Ain't Misbehavin. D Magazine named Mikel "Best Actress" in their 2004 "Best of Big D" issue. The Dallas Weekly featured her as "Queen of the Arts: The Face of Black Theater in Dallas" in March 2006.  Mikel was awarded The 2008 Column Theater Award for "Best Actress in a Musical-Equity" for Caroline, or Change.

Fire
On January 7, 2010, the Holly Hills apartment complex in Dallas where Mikel lived burned to the ground, destroying all of Mikel's clothing, possessions, and memorabilia. The local arts community responded with a series of benefit concerts, and the Dallas Theater Center announced they would donate "100 percent of all ticket sales" from the world-premiere performance of the musical, Give It Up!, in which Mikel appears.

Filmography

Film

Television

Theatre
Sources:

References

External links
Liz Mikel official website
Liz Mikel official MySpace page

Actresses from Dallas
African-American actresses
Living people
1963 births
American television actresses
American film actresses
American stage actresses
American musical theatre actresses
21st-century American actresses
20th-century American actresses
20th-century African-American women singers
21st-century African-American women
21st-century African-American people